Austrosciapus connexus (the green long-legged fly) is an Australian insect in the family Dolichopodidae.

References 

Sciapodinae
Insects of Australia
Insects described in 1835
Taxa named by Francis Walker (entomologist)